Martha Nasibù (Addis Ababa, 28 October 1931-23 March 2019)
was an Ethiopian writer and artist living in France. Her patronymic also appears as Nassibou.

The daughter of Nasibu Zeamanuel, she was born in Addis Ababa, moved to Italy in 1936 and studied at the Académie des Beaux-Arts in Paris and the Art Students League of New York. Her first exhibition of work was organized by the Ethiopian ministry of Education and Fine Arts in 1945. Nasibù was a founding member of the Ethiopian Artists Club. She lives in Perpignan. Her art is included in the collection of the National Museum of Ethiopia.

In 2005, she published Memorie di una principessa etiope, which describes the invasion of Ethiopia by the Italian Fascists.

References

External links 
 

1931 births
2019 deaths
Ethiopian poets
Ethiopian painters
Ethiopian women writers
Ethiopian women painters
Ethiopian women poets
Ethiopian emigrants to France
People from Addis Ababa
People from Perpignan